Charles Gilbert Gould (May 5, 1845 – December 5, 1916) was a Union Army soldier in the American Civil War who received the U.S. military's highest decoration, the Medal of Honor.

Gould was born in Windham County, Vermont on May 5, 1845. He was awarded the Medal of Honor, for extraordinary heroism shown on April 2, 1865, while serving as a Captain with Company H, 5th Vermont Infantry, at Petersburg, Virginia. His Medal of Honor was issued on July 30, 1890.  He was breveted to the rank of major and, after the war, became a companion of the Vermont Commandery of the Military Order of the Loyal Legion of the United States.

He died at the age of 71, on December 5, 1916, and was buried at the Windham Center Cemetery in Windham, Vermont.

Medal of Honor citation

References

External links

1845 births
1916 deaths
People from Windham County, Vermont
Burials in Vermont
People of Vermont in the American Civil War
Union Army officers
United States Army Medal of Honor recipients
American Civil War recipients of the Medal of Honor